Football was contested for men only at the 1978 Central American and Caribbean Games in Medellín, Colombia. Colombia was disqualified from the tournament.

Group stage

Group A

Group B

Colombia won 4–0, but the result was later awarded to Venezuela

Colombia drew 1–1 with Mexico, but the result was later awarded to Mexico.

Note: Colombia won 5–1, but the result was awarded to Puerto Rico on the following day, 16 July, when Colombia was disqualified due to 14 of their players being professionals.

Note: This match was not played because Colombia was disqualified.

Knockout stage

Semi-finals

Third-place match

Final

Statistics

Goalscorers

References
 

Notes

1978 Central American and Caribbean Games
1978